Pybus is a surname. Notable people with this name include:

Cassandra Pybus (born 1947), Australian historian and author
Charles Small Pybus (1766–1810), English barrister and politician
Dan Pybus (born 1997), English footballer
Dave Pybus (born 1970), English musician
Frederick Charles Pybus (1883–1975), English surgeon
George Pybus (1911–2001), English footballer
John Pybus (1880–1935), British politician
Oliver Pybus (born 1974), British biologist
Richard Pybus (born 1964), English-born cricket coach
Sean A. Pybus (born 1957), American Navy officer
W. R. Pybus (1848–1917), South Australian organist